Highway 129 (AR 129, Ark. 129, and Hwy. 129) is a designation for two north–south state highways in Union County. A southern route of  runs north from Louisiana Highway 33 (LA 33) at the Louisiana state line to US Route 82 (US 82) in Strong. A second route of  begins at US 63 and runs south to Lawson.

Route description

Louisiana to Strong
From the south, Highway 129 begins as a continuation of LA 33 at the state line. Heading north, Highway 129 produces a business route, Highway 129B, which serves the residential areas of Huttig. AR 275 continues north to US 63.

AR 129 is an undivided, two-lane road for its entire route.

US 63 to Lawson
Highway 129 begins at US 63 at Old Union and runs southeast to Union County Road 185 at Lawson. A 2010 study of annual average daily traffic (AADT) by the Arkansas State Highway and Transportation Department (AHTD) reveals that about 500 vehicles use the daily basis around Lawson, and around 1,000 vehicles per day use the road near the northern terminus.

History
Highway 129 first shows up on the 1928 Arkansas state highway map as a short route from the Louisiana state line to State Road 2 in Huttig. The route was later extended to Strong around 1930 as State Road 2 was rerouted through Crossett. The short segment to Lawson was added between 1965 and 1966 and remains along the original alignment today.

Major intersections

Huttig business route

Highway 129 Business (AR 129B, Ark. 129B, and Hwy. 129B) is a north–south state highway business route at Huttig. The route of  serves to connect Huttig to the state highway system.

Major intersections

See also

 List of state highways in Arkansas

References

External links

129
Transportation in Union County, Arkansas